This is a list of the extreme points of Eurasia, the points that are farther north, south, east or west than any other location on the continent. Some of these locations are open to debate, owing to the diverse definitions of Europe and Asia.

Mainland Eurasia is entirely located within the northern hemisphere and mostly within the eastern hemisphere, yet it touches the western hemisphere on both extremes. Thus, both the easternmost and westernmost points of Eurasia are in the western hemisphere. Mainland Eurasia crosses 200° of longitude and 76° of latitude north to south.

Extremes of Eurasia, including islands

 Northernmost Point — Cape Fligeli, Rudolf Island, Franz Josef Land, Russia (81°50'N, 59°14'E)
 Southernmost Point — Dana Island, Rote Ndao, Indonesia (11°00'S, 122°52'E)
Westernmost point —Monchique Islet, Flores Island , Azores Islands, Portugal (39°29′42.8″N, 31°16′30″W)
 Easternmost point — Big Diomede, Russia (65°46'N, 169°03'W). The International Date Line runs between the Russian Big Diomede and the neighbouring U.S.-governed Little Diomede.

Extremes of the Eurasian mainland

 Northernmost Point — Cape Chelyuskin, Russia (77°44'N, 104°15'E)
 Southernmost Point — Tanjung Piai, Malaysia (1°15'N, 103°30'E)
 Westernmost Point — Cabo da Roca, Portugal (38°46'N, 9°29'W)
 Easternmost Point — Cape Dezhnev, Russia (66°4'N, 169°39'W)

Other
 Highest altitude: — Mount Everest, Nepal and China — 
See List of places on land with elevations below sea level.
 Farthest from the ocean: — A place near Hoxtolgay in China  from the nearest coastline. See Pole of inaccessibility.

See also 
 Geography of Europe
 Geography of Asia
 Extreme points of Europe
 Extreme points of Asia
 Extreme points of Afro-Eurasia
 Extreme points of Earth

Notes

Eurasia
Geography of Europe
Geography of Asia
Extreme points of Earth
Extreme points of Asia
Eurasia